Brenda Cossman (born 1960) is a professor of law at the University of Toronto. She was the director at the Mark S. Bonham Centre for Sexual Diversity Studies from 2009 to 2018. In 2012, Cossman was named a Fellow of the Royal Society of Canada.

Education and career 
Cossman holds degrees in law from Harvard and the University of Toronto, and an undergraduate degree from Queen's University. In 2002 and 2003, she was a Visiting Professor of Law at Harvard Law School. Prior to joining the University of  Toronto, she was associate professor at Osgoode Hall Law School of York University. Her teaching and research is in the area of family law, feminist theory, law and film, and sexuality and the law.

She is actively involved in law reform, particularly in the area of same sex couples and definitions of family.  She authored reports for the now-defunct Law Commission of Canada as well as the Ontario Law Reform Commission on the legal regulation of adult relationships.

Cossman is also a frequent commentator in the media on issues relating to law and sexuality, most frequently for The Globe and Mail and the CBC.  She is prominently featured as a commentator in John Greyson's CBC documentary After the Bath (1996) about the London sex scandal. She also served as a member of the Pink Triangle Press Board of Directors for 10 years, working as a frequent contributor to their main publication, Xtra!

Selected publications

 The New Sex Wars: Sexual Harm in the #Metoo Era, New York University Press, 2021. 
 Sexual Citizens: The Legal and Cultural Regulation of Sex and Belonging, Stanford University Press, 2007.  
 Privatization, Law, and the Challenge to Feminism, co-editor, University of Toronto Press, 2002.
 Bad Attitudes on Trial: Pornography, Feminism and the Butler Decision, co-author, University of Toronto Press, 1997.
 Censorship and the Arts: Law, Controversy, Debate, Facts, Ontario Association of Art Galleries, 1995.

References

External links 
 https://web.archive.org/web/20110108025341/http://www.uc.utoronto.ca/content/view/284/1809/
 https://web.archive.org/web/20110106023257/http://www.law.utoronto.ca/index.asp

1960 births
Living people
Lawyers in Ontario
Canadian legal scholars
Academic staff of the University of Toronto
University of Toronto alumni
Queen's University at Kingston alumni
Harvard Law School alumni
Canadian lesbian writers
Canadian women non-fiction writers
Canadian women lawyers
Women legal scholars
Fellows of the Royal Society of Canada
21st-century Canadian women writers
21st-century Canadian non-fiction writers
21st-century Canadian LGBT people